Northampton is an unincorporated area in Harris County, Texas. The Northampton Municipal Utility District manages park, electricity, water, and sewage services for the community.  the MUD has 1,625 households. The names "Spring, Texas", or "Klein, Texas" may be used in postal correspondence.

 the MUD president was E.C. Thomas.

History
The community was established circa 1967.

In 2012 the MUD proposed a bond so it could expand.

Education
Northampton is located in the Klein Independent School District.  the zoned schools, all adjacent, were Northampton Elementary School, Hildebrandt Intermediate School, and Klein Oak High School.  most residents travel by foot or on bicycle to school even though school bus services were available.

Northampton Elementary's capacity is 809. It was to be relieved by the opening of French Elementary School in 2015.

References

External links
 Northampton Municipal Utility District
 Northampton Elementary School

Unincorporated communities in Texas
Unincorporated communities in Harris County, Texas